Marjolein Lindemans (born 17 February 1994) is a Belgian former heptathlete who competed in international elite events. She is a World and European bronze medalist and a Belgian champion in the long jump and pentathlon.

References

1994 births
Living people
Sportspeople from Leuven
Belgian heptathletes
Belgian female hurdlers
Belgian female long jumpers
Belgian female sprinters
Belgian pentathletes
21st-century Belgian women